Cressage is a village and civil parish in Shropshire, England. It lies on the junction of the A458 and B4380 roads and the River Severn flows around its northern boundary. The Royal Mail postcode begins SY5. The parish council is combined with the neighbouring parish of Sheinton.

History
The village is mentioned in the Domesday Book under the name Christesache. The meaning is "Christ's Oak", and this over time has been corrupted to form the word "Cressage".  The oak tree was part of a forest (which no longer exists), and a cutting from it was planted near the village in 1616.  This was later relocated due to railway construction.

In 584, Saint Augustine reputedly preached under the Cressage Oak.

On 30 June 2012, the Olympic torch passed through the village on its way to London.

Geography
The Severn Valley Railway once ran through the village calling at Cressage railway station, before the section between Shrewsbury and Bridgnorth was dismantled.  The village lies on the intersection of the A458 and the B4380, near to the River Severn.  Cressage is 4 miles to the northwest of the nearest town Much Wenlock and is 8 miles southeast of Shrewsbury.

Cressage Bridge lies several hundred metres north of the village and carries the B4380 road over the River Severn. Designed by L.G. Mouchel and built in 1913, it has a hollow construction of reinforced concrete and a span of 170 feet (52 metres).  There are two hexagonal brick pill boxes, one on each side of the river, constructed during the Second World War to defend the bridge in the event of enemy invasion.

The parish's war memorial, in the form of a granite 'wheel' or Celtic cross, stands at the village's main road junction on the A458.

Amenities
Cressage had a public house, "The Eagles" which was shut down early 2008, but reopened December 2009. It was once again shut down in early 2015 and sold at auction.  It currently remains closed.

The Anglican church, "Christ Church" holds regular services.

There is a small village store and a health centre.

Notable people
Among the village's well-known inhabitants was Admiral Sir Herbert Annesley Packer, who was born in the village on 9 October 1894.

See also
Listed buildings in Cressage

References

External links

Populated places on the River Severn
Villages in Shropshire
Civil parishes in Shropshire